Raphael of St. Joseph Kalinowski (1 September 1835 – 15 November 1907) was a Polish Discalced Carmelite friar inside the Russian partition of Polish–Lithuanian Commonwealth, in the city of Vilnius. He was a teacher, engineer, prisoner of war, royal tutor, and priest, who founded many Carmelite monasteries around Poland after their suppression by the Russians.

Kalinowski was canonized by Pope John Paul II in 1991, the first man to be so recognized in the Order of Discalced Carmelites since John of the Cross.

Childhood

Raphael was born Józef Kalinowski to a noble "szlachta" family in the city of  Vilnius (Vilna). At the time he was born, the area was known as a Russian partition, though it had formerly been part of the Polish–Lithuanian Commonwealth.  He was the second son of Andrew Kalinowski (1805–1878), an assistant superintendent professor of mathematics at the local Institute for Nobles (Instytut Szlachecki). His mother, Josephine Połońska, also a noblewoman, Leliwa coat of arms died a few months after he was born, leaving him and his older brother Victor without a mother.  His father then married Josephine's sister (a practice that was not uncommon in that time), Sophie Połońska, and had three more children: Charles, Emily, and Gabriel.  After Sophie died in 1845, Andrew married again, this time to the 17-year-old Sophie Puttkamer, daughter of Maryla Wereszczak (famous at the time for being written about by Adam Mickiewicz), who became mother to all of Andrew's existing children and had four more of her own: Mary, Alexander, Monica, and George.

From the age of 8, Kalinowski attended the Institute for Nobles at Vilna, and graduated with honors in 1850. He next attended the School of Agriculture (Instytut Agronomiczny) at Hory-Horki, near Orsha.

Military career
The Russians strictly limited opportunities for further education, so in 1853 he enlisted in the Imperial Russian Army and entered the Nicholayev Engineering Academy (Mikołajewska Szkoła Inżynierii).  The Army promoted him to Second Lieutenant in 1856.  In 1857 he worked as an associate professor of mathematics, and from 1858 to 1860, he worked as an engineer who helped design the Odessa-Kiev-Kursk railway.

In 1862 the Imperial Russian Army promoted him to captain and stationed him in Brest, Belarus, but he still sympathized with the Poles.  He consequently resigned from the Imperial Russian Army in 1863 to serve as minister of war for the January Uprising, a Polish insurrection, in the Vilnius region.  He determined never to sentence anyone to death nor to execute any prisoner.
When the Poles rose against the Russians in 1863, Raphael joined them and was soon taken prisoner. Very few survived the forced
march to slave labour in Siberia, but Raphael was sustained by his faith and became a spiritual leader to the prisoners.
He was released ten years later.

Siberia
On 24 March 1864, Russian authorities arrested Kalinowski and in June condemned him to death by firing squad.  His family intervened, and the Russians, fearing that their Polish subjects would revere him as a political martyr, commuted the sentence to 10 years in katorga, the Siberian labor camp system.  They forced him to trek overland to the salt mines of Usolye-Sibirskoye near Irkutsk, Siberia, a journey that took nine months.

Three years after arriving in Usolye, Kalinowski moved to Irkutsk. In 1871/1872 he did meteorological research for the Siberian subdivision of the Russian Geographical Society.  He also participated in research expedition of Benedykt Dybowski to Kultuk, on the shore of Lake Baikal.  Authorities released him from Siberia in 1873 but exiled him from Lithuania; he then moved to Paris, France.

Royal tutor
Kalinowski returned to Warsaw in 1874, where he became a tutor to 16-year-old Prince August Czartoryski. The prince was diagnosed with tuberculosis in 1876, and Kalinowski accompanied him to various health destinations in France, Switzerland, Italy, and Poland. Kalinowski was a major influence on the young man (known as "Gucio"), who later became a priest and was beatified by Pope John Paul II in 2004.

Later Kalinowski decided to travel to the city of Brest where he began a Sunday school at the fortress in Brest-Litovsk where he was a captain, he became increasingly aware of the state persecution of the church, and of his native Poles.

Carmelite friar and priest
In 1877 Kalinowski was admitted to the Carmelite priory in Linz, and where he was given the religious name of Brother Raphael of St. Joseph, O.C.D. The name "of St. Joseph" had nothing to do with his birthname—it was common for many Carmelites to list their name as "of St. Joseph", after the "Convent of St. Joseph" founded by Teresa of Avila, co-founder of the Discalced Carmelite Reform.

Kalinowski was ordained as a priest at Czerna in 1882 by Bishop Albin Dunajewski, and in 1883 he became prior of the monastery at Czerna.

Kalinowski founded multiple Catholic organizations around Poland and Ukraine, most prominent of which was a monastery in Wadowice, Poland, where he was also prior.  He founded a monasteries of Discalced Carmelite nuns in Przemyśl in 1884, and Lvov in 1888.

From 1892 to 1907 Kalinowski worked to document the life and work of Mother Theresa Marchocka, a 17th-century Discalced Carmelite nun, to assist with her beatification.

Kalinowski died in Wadowice of tuberculosis in 1907. Fourteen years later, Karol Wojtyła, later known as Pope John Paul II, was born in the same town.

Kalinowski was a noted spiritual director of both Catholic and Russian Orthodox faithful.

Veneration

Kalinowski's remains were originally kept in the monastery cemetery, but this caused difficulties because of the large number of pilgrims who came visiting.  So many of them took handfuls of dirt from the grave that the nuns had to keep replacing the earth and plants at the cemetery.  His body was later moved to a tomb, but the pilgrims went there instead, often scratching with their hands at the plaster, just to have some relic to keep with them.  His remains were then moved to a chapel in Czerna, where they remain.

Pope John Paul II beatified Kalinowski in 1983 in Kraków, in front of a crowd of over two million people. On 17 November 1991, he was canonized when, in St. Peter's Basilica, Pope John Paul II declared his boyhood hero a saint. Rafał was the first friar in the Order of the Discalced Carmelites to have been canonized since co-founder John of the Cross (1542–1591) became a saint in 1726.

Kalinowski's feast day is celebrated on 19 November in the Discalced Carmelites order and on 20 November by the Catholic Church in Poland.

Catholics revere him as a patron saint of soldiers and officers of Poland
and also of Polish exiles in Siberia.

Literary works
Carmelite Chronicles of the monasteries and convents of Vilnius, Warsaw, Leopolis, and Kraków
Translated into Polish the autobiography of Therese of Lisieux, The Story of a Soul
Wrote biography of Hermann Cohen (Carmelite) (a famous Jewish pianist, who had converted to the Carmelite Order and become "Father Augustine Mary of the Blessed Sacrament")
Kalinowski, Rafal, Czesc Matki Bozej w Karmelu Polskim, in Ksiega Pamiatkowa Marianska, Lwów-Warszawa 1905, vol. 1, part II, pp 403–421
Kalinowski, J. Wspomnienia 1805-1887 (Memoirs 1805–1887), ed. R. Bender, Lublin 1965
Kalinowski, Jozef, Listy (Letters), ed. Czeslaus Gil, vol. I, Lublin 1978, vol II, Kraków 1986-1987
Kalinowski, Rafal, Swietymi badzcie. Konferencje i teksty ascetyczne, ed. Czeslaus Gil, Kraków 1987

See also
Book of the First Monks
Byzantine Discalced Carmelites
Carmelite Rule of St. Albert
Constitutions of the Carmelite Order
Eastern Christianity
Ecumenism
Jan Tyranowski
List of Polish saints

Notes

References
Biography by Eileen Ahern, OCDS
Elonka's family: Pics and info about Saint Raphael - a biographical page by his great-great-grandniece, with references to several published biographies
 Polish-language page about Saint Raphael with many pictures
 Beatification of Father Raphael Kalinowski and Brother Albert Chmielowski in Krakow (June 22, 1983)
Praskiewicz, Szczepan, Saint Raphael Kalinowski: an Introduction to His Life and Spirituality, 1998, ICS Publications, 
Blessed Raphael Kalinowski of Saint Joseph, His Life in Pictures, 1983, Rome, Postulation General
Gil, Czeslaus, OCD, Rafał Kalinowski
Monk Matthew, Saint from the Salt Mines, 1986, Mid-Suffolk Printing Company, distributed by Carmelite Book Service, Oxford

"Miracle Clears Way for Sainthood Cause." The Catholic Sun, July 19, 1990

External links

Rafał Kalinowski

1835 births
1907 deaths
Clergy from Vilnius
Raphael
Lithuanian people of Polish descent
Members of Polish government (January Uprising)
Polish exiles in the Russian Empire
Discalced Carmelites
19th-century Lithuanian Roman Catholic priests
20th-century Lithuanian Roman Catholic priests
Christian writers
Polish Roman Catholic saints
Imperial Russian Army personnel
Carmelite saints
20th-century Christian saints
Beatifications by Pope John Paul II
Canonizations by Pope John Paul II
Venerated Catholics by Pope John Paul II